Carl Ethan Akeley (May 19, 1864 – November 17, 1926) was a pioneering American taxidermist, sculptor, biologist, conservationist, inventor, and nature photographer, noted for his contributions to American museums, most notably to the Milwaukee Public Museum, Field Museum of Natural History and the American Museum of Natural History. He is considered the father of modern taxidermy. He was the founder of the AMNH Exhibitions Lab, the interdisciplinary department that fuses scientific research with immersive design.

Career

Akeley was born to Daniel Webster Akeley and Julia Glidden in Clarendon, New York, and grew up on a farm, attending school for only three years. He learned taxidermy from David Bruce in Brockport, New York, and then entered an apprenticeship in taxidermy at Ward's Natural Science Establishment in Rochester, New York. While at Ward's Akeley also helped mount P.T. Barnum's Jumbo after the latter was killed in a railroad accident.

In 1886 Akeley moved on to the Milwaukee Public Museum (MPM) in Milwaukee, Wisconsin.  Akeley remained in Milwaukee for six years, refining "model" techniques used in taxidermy. At the Milwaukee Public Museum, his early work consisted of animals found in Wisconsin prairies and woodlands. One of these was a diorama of a muskrat group, which is sometimes referred to as the first museum diorama; however, such dioramas, and dioramas depicting "habitat groups," dated back well into the early 1800s, and were quite popular with taxidermists in Victorian England. He also created historical reindeer and orangutan exhibits. 

Akeley left the Milwaukee Public Museum in 1892 and set up a private studio from which he continued to do contract work, including three mustangs for the Smithsonian Institution for exhibition at the World's Columbian Exposition. In 1896, he joined the Field Museum of Natural History in Chicago, where he developed his innovative taxidermy techniques, notably the creation of lightweight, hollow, but sturdy mannequins on which to mount the animals' skins. His techniques, which involved sculpting the realistic musculature of the animals in active poses before mounting the skin, were also notable for their life-like representation. Akeley was the Field Museum's chief taxidermist from 1896-1909 and prepared more than 130 mounted specimens and dioramas. His most famous creations include the "Fighting African Elephants" in the central hall of the Field Museum, killed by Akeley and his wife Delia Akeley before being brought to Chicago for mounting and first put on display in 1909.

He was also a prolific inventor, perfecting a "cement gun" to repair the crumbling facade of the Field Columbian Museum in Chicago (the old Palace of Fine Arts from the World's Columbian Exposition. He is today known as the inventor of shotcrete, or "gunite" as he termed it at the time. Akeley did not use sprayable concrete in his taxidermy work, as is sometimes suggested. Akeley also invented a highly mobile motion picture camera for capturing wildlife, started a company to manufacture it, and patented it in 1915. The Akeley "pancake" camera (so-called because it was round) was soon adopted by the War Department for use in World War I, primarily for aerial use, and later by newsreel companies, and Hollywood studios, primarily for aerial footage and action scenes. F. Trubee Davison covered these and other Akeley inventions in a special issue of Natural History magazine. Akeley also wrote several books, including stories for children, and an autobiography In Brightest Africa (1920). He was awarded more than 30 patents for his inventions.

Akeley specialized in African mammals, particularly the gorilla and the elephant.  As a taxidermist, he improved on techniques of fitting the skin over a carefully prepared and sculpted form of the animal's body, producing very lifelike specimens, with consideration of musculature, wrinkles, and veins.  He also displayed the specimens in groups in a natural setting.  Many animals that he preserved he had personally collected.

The Akeley Method 
First and foremost, Akeley believed and was obsessively committed to the idea that taxidermy could produce mounted animals that look not just lifelike, but alive. Akeley was equally committed to presenting mounts in the context of their scientifically accurate environments and social interactions.

Akeley's techniques resulted in anatomically accurate, skinless manikins of an animal in lifelike actions and postures. The mannequin was extremely lightweight and hollow and made primarily of papier mache and wire mesh. Akeley based the mannequin on precise field measurements and photographs as well as his understanding of the animal's anatomy and behavior in its natural environment. After creating the mannequin, the hide and hooves were meticulously attached.

The steps to the Akeley Method:

 Akeley first sculpted a detailed and precise 1/12th scale clay model of his ultimate mount
 He then built an armature using: skeletal bones, wood, metal rods, wire, and wire mesh
 Akeley then covered the armature with plaster and then clay, which he sculpted to produce an exact model of the living animal
 He then coated the clay model with plaster. When dry, the plaster mold was removed from the clay in sections and resulted in a perfect mold of the sculpted model
 Papier mache pulp and supportive mesh wire was applied to the inside of the plaster mold and when dried produced a full-scale hollow mannequin in the exact form of the original sculpture
The mannequin was clothed with the original pelt and sewn up so that not a seam is discernible

African expeditions

Akeley first traveled to Africa in 1896 when he was invited by Daniel Elliot, Curator of the Zoology Department in the new Columbian Field Museum, on an eight month expedition to Somaliland. It was on this trip that Akeley came face to face with a deadly 80-pound leopard which he strangled with his bare hands. Akeley collected hundreds of animal specimens including: hartebeest, gazelles, hyenas, kudus, oryx, and lions. The process of collecting specimens included: killing, measuring, photographing, skinning, de-boning, preserving, and packing them for shipment back to Chicago.

In 1905, Marshall Field funded Akeley’s next trip to Africa which lasted twelve months and brought back two bull elephants which he would later mount for display. Akeley took nearly 1,000 glass plate photos and collected 17 tons of material including: 400 mammal skins, 1200 small mammal skins, 800 bird skins, and a fair number of bird and mammal skeletons. In addition to zoologic material he also collected more than 900 anthropological specimens and crates of leaves that he would use as models for his dioramas.

In 1909, Akeley accompanied Theodore Roosevelt on a year-long expedition in Africa funded by the Smithsonian Institution and began working at the American Museum of Natural History in New York City, where his efforts can still be seen in the Akeley Hall of African Mammals.  Akeley joined the Explorers Club in 1912, having been sponsored by three of the Club's seven Charter Members: Frank Chapman, Henry Collins Walsh, and Marshall Saville. For qualifying, Akeley wrote only, "Explorations in Somaliland and British East Africa." He became the Club's sixth president serving from 1917–1918.In 1921, eager to learn about gorillas to determine if killing them for museum dioramas was justified, Akeley led an expedition to Mt. Mikeno in the Virunga Mountains at the edge of the then Belgian Congo. At that time, gorillas were quite exotic, with very few even in zoos, and collecting such animals for educational museum exhibitions was not uncommon. In the process of "collecting" several mountain gorillas, Akeley's attitude was fundamentally changed and for the remainder of his life he worked for the establishment of a gorilla preserve in the Virungas. In 1925, greatly influenced by Akeley, King Albert I of Belgium established the Albert National Park, (since renamed Virunga National Park). It was Africa's first national park. Opposed to hunting them for sport or trophies, he remained an advocate of collection for scientific and educational purposes. One of the members of his 1921 expedition was six-year-old Alice Hastings Bradley, who later wrote science fiction under the name James Tiptree, Jr.

Akeley began his fifth journey to the Congo with the start of the dry season in late 1926. He died on November 18 of dysentery and was buried in Africa, just miles from where he encountered his first gorilla, the "Old Man of Mikeno".

Personal life 
His wife, Mary Jobe Akeley, married him two years before he died.  He had previously been married to Delia J. Akeley (1875–1970) for nearly 20 years.  Delia Akeley accompanied him on two of his biggest and most productive safaris to Africa in 1905 and again in 1909.  Delia later returned to Africa twice under the auspices of the Brooklyn Museum of Arts and Sciences.  She organized and led both trips and lived for several months in the Ituri Forest with Pygmies.

Legacy 

The World Taxidermy & Fish Carving Championships awards gold medallions that bear Carl Akeley's likeness—based on a photograph he had taken at Stein Photography in Milwaukee—to its "Best in World" winners. There is also a Carl Akeley Award for the most artistic mount at the World Show. The medallions were sculpted by Floyd Easterman of the Milwaukee Public Museum. The Akeley Hall of African Mammals of the American Museum of Natural History and the Akeley Memorial Hall at The Field Museum are named for him.

Further reading
Akeley, Carl. In Brightest Africa, Garden City Publishers, 1920.
Akeley, Delia J. Jungle Portraits, Macmillan, 1930.
Akeley, Mary Jobe. Carl Akeley's Africa: The account of the Akeley-Eastman-Pomeroy African Hall Expedition of the American Museum of Natural History, Dodd, Mead, 1929.
Akeley, Mary Jobe. The Wilderness Lives Again: Carl Akeley and the Great Adventure, Dodd, Mead, 1940
Andrews, Roy Chapman Beyond Adventure: The Lives of Three Explorers, Duell, Sloan and Pearce, 1954.
Bodry-Sanders, Penelope. Carl Akeley: Africa's Collector, Africa's Savior, Paragon House, 1991.
Bodry-Sanders, Penelope. African Obsession, The Life and Legacy of Carl Akeley (2nd ed.), Jacksonville, FL:Batax Museum Publishing, 1998.  
Kirk, Jay. Kingdom Under Glass, Henry Holt and Company, 2010. .
(video) "Kingdom Under Glass", Jay Kirk, C-SPAN, October 27, 2010.
Haraway, Donna Jeanne. Primate Visions: Gender, Race, and Nature in the World of Modern Science. New York: Routledge, 1989
"An Elephant's Tale":

Notes

External links

Google Patents US1310776
 
Guide to Carl Akeley resources at the Field Museum Library
 The Carl Ethan Akeley papers, A.A31, at Rare Books, Special Collections, and Preservation, River Campus Libraries, University of Rochester.

American naturalists
American inventors
Taxidermists
1864 births
1926 deaths
People associated with the American Museum of Natural History
People associated with the Field Museum of Natural History
People from Clarendon, New York
People from Brockport, New York
Artists from Rochester, New York
Artists from Milwaukee
20th-century American sculptors
20th-century American male artists
19th-century American sculptors
American male sculptors
Sculptors from New York (state)
Sculptors from Wisconsin
Scientists from New York (state)
19th-century American male artists